Yulian Butsmaniuk (1885-1967) was a Ukrainian and Canadian painter, and photographer

In 1906, he met Modest Sosenko and studied with him,  working on the painting of the Konyukha church in Berezhany. He studied at the Cracow Art Academy. He served in World War I. He painted decoration at the Monastery of the Nativity and the Church of the Heart of Christ. He studied at the Prague Art Academy. In 1950, he immigrated to Edmonton, Canada. He decorated the Cathedral of St. Josapha in Edmonton.

Further reading

References 

1967 deaths
1885 births